George Elliot may refer to:

George Elliot (Royal Navy officer, born 1784) (1784–1863), British naval officer and Member of Parliament for Roxburghshire 1832–1835
George Elliot (Royal Navy officer, born 1813) (1813–1901), British naval officer and Member of Parliament for Chatham 1874–1875
Sir George Elliot, 1st Baronet (1814–1893), British businessman and Conservative Member of Parliament 1868–1880, 1886–1892
Sir George Elliot, 2nd Baronet (1844–1895), British businessman and Member of Parliament 1874–1885, 1886–1895
George Elliot, Australian actor who wrote, produced and starred in 2004's The Crop
George Elliot (rugby league) (born 1991), English centre and wing

See also
George Eliot (disambiguation)
George Elliott (disambiguation)